Charles Grant, 1st Baron Glenelg PC FRS (26 October 1778 – 23 April 1866) was a Scottish politician and colonial administrator who served as Secretary of State for War and the Colonies

Background and education
Grant was born in Kidderpore, Bengal Presidency, Company Raj, the eldest son of Charles Grant, chairman of the directors of the British East India Company. His brother, Sir Robert Grant, was also an MP as well as Governor of Bombay. He was educated at Magdalene College, Cambridge, and became a fellow in 1802. He was called to the bar in 1807.

Political career
In 1811 Grant was elected to the British House of Commons as Member of Parliament for Inverness Burghs. He held that seat until 1818, when he was returned for Inverness-shire. He was a Lord of the Treasury from December 1813 until August 1819, when he became Chief Secretary for Ireland and a Privy Counsellor. In 1823 he was appointed Vice-President of the Board of Trade; from September 1827 to June 1828 he was President of the Board of Trade and Treasurer of the Navy.

Grant broke with the Tories over Reform and joined the Whigs (via the Canningite Tory splinter group).  He was President of the Board of Control under Lord Grey and Lord Melbourne from November 1830 to November 1834. At the Board of Control Grant was primarily responsible for the Act of 1833 that altered the constitution of the Government of India. In April 1835 he became Secretary of State for War and the Colonies, and was created Baron Glenelg, of Glenelg in the County of Inverness. His term of office was a stormy one. His differences with Sir Benjamin d'Urban, Governor of Cape Colony, were serious; but more so were those with King William IV and others over the administration of Canada. Lord Glenelg was still Secretary when the Canadian rebellion broke out in 1837; his policy was fiercely attacked in Parliament; he became involved in disputes with Lord Durham, and the movement for his supersession found supporters even among his colleagues in the cabinet. In February 1839 Lord Glenelg resigned. He has been called the last of the Canningites.

Personal life
Lord Glenelg died in Cannes, France in April 1866, aged 87. The barony became extinct on his death.

Legacy
A ship, the Lord Glenelg was named after him which voyaged from Britain to Australia in 1841.

Notes

External links 
 

1778 births
1866 deaths
18th-century Scottish people
19th-century Scottish politicians
Politicians from Kolkata
Presidents of the Board of Control
British Secretaries of State
Whig (British political party) MPs for Scottish constituencies
Scottish Tory MPs (pre-1912)
Fellows of Magdalene College, Cambridge
Grant, Charles
Alumni of Magdalene College, Cambridge
Barons in the Peerage of the United Kingdom
Fellows of the Royal Society
Members of the Privy Council of the United Kingdom
Members of the Privy Council of Ireland
Grant, Charles
Grant, Charles
Grant, Charles
Grant, Charles
Grant, Charles
Grant, Charles
Grant, Charles
Grant, Charles
UK MPs who were granted peerages
Chief Secretaries for Ireland
Presidents of the Board of Trade
Peers of the United Kingdom created by William IV